Palić is a south-slavic surname. Notable people include:

 Antun Palić (born 1988), Croatian footballer
 Avdo Palić (1958-1995), Bosnian military officer
 Kerim Palić (born 1997), Bosnian footballer
 Petar Palić (born 1972), Croatian bishop
 Tea Palić (born 1991), Croatian alpine skier
 Vinko Palić, Croatian mass-shooter

Serbo-Croatian-language surnames
Bosnian surnames
Croatian surnames